The Central Bank of the Dominican Republic (BCRD) was established by the Monetary and Banking Law of 1947 as the central bank of the Dominican Republic, responsible for regulating the country's monetary and banking system. The Bank's headquarters is in Santo Domingo, and its current governor is Héctor Valdez Albizu.

Establishment and objectives
Organic Law no. 6142 of December 29, 1962, authorized the central bank to promote and maintain favorable monetary, foreign exchange and credit conditions for the stability and development of the national economy. The central bank's functions include regulating market liquidity levels by: determining deposit reserve requirements for banks; implementing lending limits when necessary; and issuing negotiable securities. Additional functions include controlling movements of the exchange rate and introducing resolutions pertaining to the financial system.

Activities and structure
The BCRD implements all changes to banking regulation proposed by the Monetary Board (Junta Monetaria) which is the highest body of authority within the institution. The Board consists of ten members, all of which are appointed by the executive. The governor of the central bank heads the Monetary Board while the Ministry of Finance and the Ministry of Industry and Commerce each have a seat on the Board. The BCRD Governor is appointed by the executive for a period of two years, though with Héctor Valdez Albizu there has been continuity at this senior post for several years despite political administration changes. Albizu was the BCRD governor from 1994 until 2000, again holding the post from August 2004.

Since late 1993, BCRD has worked with the sponsorship of the Inter-American Development Bank to improve several areas of banking practice.

Performance and reform since the 1990s
Monetary policy during the 1990s was conducted within a framework of limited central bank autonomy and a managed floating exchange rate regime. A key objective of the BCDR was price stability in conjunction with real output growth and reserve accumulation, such that the stock of BCRD net domestic assets became the targeted policy instrument. Liquidity was managed directly through credit controls and freezing asset reserves. BCRD also intervened in the private foreign exchange market, smoothing the volatility of the exchange rate. However, the monetary authorities recently moved towards the interest rate as its indirect monetary policy instrument, namely through issuing central bank paper (certificados de participacion), with prices determined at auction.

The macroeconomic situation suffered a major shock in 2003 with the banking crisis and subsequent bail out by the BCRD, which guaranteed all Baninter (one of the major banks that failed) deposits and providing liquidity to two other banks at a total cost to the budget equivalent to 21 percent of the GDP. The banking crisis led to a major capital flight, a sharp currency depreciation, high inflation and significant fiscal pressures (exacerbated by an ongoing electricity crisis), together creating large macroeconomic imbalances and an environment of uncertainty and perceived risk. In October 2003 the BCRD raised the commission on foreign exchange transactions for purchasing imported goods to 10 percent and subsequently to 13 percent at the beginning of 2005.

Governors
Jesús María Troncoso, 1947 - 1951
Wenceslao Troncoso, 1951 - 1952
Manuel Ruiz Tejada, 1952 - 1953
José Ernesto García, 1953
S. Salvador Ortiz, 1953 - 1954
José Joaquín Gómez, 1954 - 1956
Milton Messina, 1956 - 1957
Arturo Despradel, 1957 - 1958
Juan A. Morales, 1958
Virgilio Álvarez Sánchez, 1958 - 1959
Oscar G. Ginebra Henríquez, 1958 - 1960
Manuel V. Ramos, 1960 - 1961
Silvestre Alba de Moya, 1961
A. Amado Hernández, 1961 - 1962
José Joaquín Gómez, 1962 - 1963
Diógenes H. Fernández, 1963 - 1976
Fernando Periche, 1976 - 1978
Eduardo Fernández, 1978 - 1980
Carlos Despradel, 1980 - 1982
Bernardo Vega, 1982 - 1984
José Santos Taveras, 1984
Hugo Guiliani Cury, 1984 - 1986
Luis Julián Pérez, 1986 - 1987
Roberto Saladín, 1987 - 1989
Guillermo Caram, 1989 - 1990
Luis F. Toral Córdoba, 1990 - 1993
Mario Read Vittini, 1993 - 1994
Héctor Valdez Albizu, 1994 - 2000
Francisco Guerrero Prats-Ramírez, 2000 - 2003
José Lois Malkún, 2003 - 2004
Héctor Valdez Albizu, 2004 -

See also
Banks of the Dominican Republic

Notes

External links

  Central Bank of the Dominican Republic official site

Dominican Republic
Economy of the Dominican Republic
Banco Central de la Republica Dominicana
1947 establishments in the Dominican Republic
Banks established in 1947